Sodomite may refer to:
 A person who practices sodomy
 A resident of Sodom
 Sodomites (film), a 1998 short film by Gaspar Noé